Our Only May Amelia is a 1999 American historical youth novel by Jennifer L. Holm. Set in 1899 near Astoria, Oregon, it follows a young girl's coming of age amongst the region's Finnish community, and her life as the youngest of seven children—and the only girl—of Finnish immigrant parents. The novel is based on diaries written by Holm's aunt.

Reception
Publishers Weekly called Our Only May Amelia an "extraordinary debut novel" with an "unforgettable heroine." The novel was the recipient of a Newbery Medal in 2000.

Related works
In 2012, Holm published a sequel, The Trouble with May Amelia, set directly after the events of the original novel.

References

1999 novels
1999 debut novels
American bildungsromans
American historical novels
American young adult novels
Finnish-American history
Newbery Medal–winning works
Novels about families
Novels set in the 1890s
Novels set in Oregon
Novels set in Washington (state)
Works based on diaries